Brissus latecarinatus is a species of sea urchins of the family Brissidae. Their armour is covered with spines. Brissus latecarinatus was first scientifically described in 1778 by Nathanael Gottfried Leske.

References 

Animals described in 1778
latecarinatus
Taxa named by Nathanael Gottfried Leske